Patrick Shannon Hodgson (born January 30, 1944) is a former American football end in the National Football League for the Washington Redskins.  He played college football at the University of Georgia. After his career, he would serve as a WR and TE coach for multiple NFL teams.

Coaching History
1978 San Diego Chargers (WR)
1979-1987 New York Giants (WR)
1992-1995 Pittsburgh Steelers (TE)
1996-1997 New York Jets (TE)

1944 births
Living people
Players of American football from Columbus, Georgia
American football wide receivers
Georgia Bulldogs football players
Washington Redskins players
Pittsburgh Steelers coaches
New York Giants coaches